The Karachi Kings is a franchise cricket team that represents Karachi in the Pakistan Super League. They are one of the five teams that had a competition in the 2016 Pakistan Super League. The team was captained by Shoaib Malik and then by Ravi Bopara, and they stand on fourth position after winning just two matches from their eight matches in the PSL 2016.

Background
Karachi Kings is a franchise cricket team representing Karachi, which plays in the PSL.
In 2015, the Pakistan Cricket Board (PCB) announced that the inaugural season of the Pakistan Super League would take place in February 2016 in the United Arab Emirates. Team is owned by the ARY Group which bought it for US$26 Million for 10 years.
It finished the inaugural season of PSL at fourth position.

Team anthem
Anthem for the team "Dilon Ke Hum Hain Badshah" was sung by Ali Azmat. It was released on 8 January 2016, and its music video was released on 30 January 2016.

Squad 
Players with international caps before the start of the 2016 PSL season are listed in bold

Source: CricInfo

Season summary

Shoaib Malik was the Captain of the Kings in 2016 Season. Kings during draft Day 1 and 2 picked international players like Shoaib Malik, Fawad Alam, Shakib Al Hasan, Ravi Bopara, Imad Wasim, Sohail Tanvir, Mohammad Amir, TM Dilshan, Lendl Simmons, Shahzaib Hasan, Sohail Khan, Bilawal Bhatti and Mushfiqur Rahim. Kings kicked off their campaign with an easy win against Lahore Qalandars at Dubai International Cricket Stadium due to Mohammad Amir's Hat-trick. Kings restricted Qalandars on 125 for 8 and won the match by 7 Wickets. They played their second match against Quetta Gladiators defeated Kings by eight wickets. Kings, while batting first set 148 run target. Kings failed to defend the target and lost with in 17th over of the game. The tournament does not went well for them as they lost six out of eight matches played finishing 4th however qualifying above Lahore Qalandars who won same number of matches but Kings having better net run rate qualified for the play-offs. Shoaib Malik stepped down from captaincy of Karachi Kings a day before this match and Ravi Bopara was named his successor. On 20th Feb 2016 they played a 2nd playoff - eliminator against Islamabad United things does not went well for them losing the toss sent into bat first by United they were restricted on the lowest score of the tournament (111). Ravi Bopara playing his first match as new Captain of the side was the highest run scorer he made 36 from 37. Disappointment followed them in the bowling as well as they could not stop United's batsmen scoring free runs and were easily crushed by nine wickets in the 15th over of the game only wicket-taker for the side was Sohail Khan as a result from this defeat they were eliminated from the tournament.

Season standings
Karachi Kings finished fourth in the points table of 2016 Pakistan Super League.

Match log

References

2016 in Sindh
2016 Pakistan Super League
Kings in 2016
2016